Bill Wilkerson  (1945 – November 2, 2017) was an American radio personality and sports announcer who enjoyed a long career on St. Louis stations KMOX (1969–1996) and KTRS (1996–2006).

Early life
Wilkerson was born and raised in St. Louis, Missouri. He majored in journalism and received his B.A. at Southern Illinois University in Carbondale, Illinois, where he played football.

Radio career
In 1969, Wilkerson got his first job on KMOX in St. Louis. He partnered with Bob Costas for the first year of St. Louis Spirits (ABA), 1975-76. He served as a radio play-by-play announcer for St. Louis Cardinals ("Big Red") football from 1973 until the team left for Phoenix following the 1987 season, and returned for one season in 1994, the franchise's first as the Arizona Cardinals.. He became the first black to be the main play-by-play man for an NFL team, and the first color announcer when he teamed up with Dan Kelly to do St. Louis Blues (NHL) games. He also broadcast Missouri Tigers football from 1976 until 1993. While handling football games, he also co-hosted KMOX's "Total Information AM" (The Morning Show) with Bob Hardy and Wendy Wiese for many years. He and Wiese changed stations in St. Louis for rival KTRS in 1996. He retired from radio in 2006.

Personal life
He started MPS Worldwide, a bulk chemical company after he retired from KTRS. He was a longtime board member of Mathews-Dickey Boys' & Girls' Club in St. Louis, and served on the boards of the American Red Cross, St. Louis Children's Hospital, and the St. Louis Zoological Society. He is a member of the Mizzou Media Hall of Fame.

Death
Wilkerson died on November 2, 2017, at his home in Florissant, Missouri after a brief illness.

References

1945 births
2017 deaths
African-American radio personalities
African-American sports journalists
American Basketball Association announcers
American radio sports announcers
Culture of St. Louis
National Football League announcers
Missouri Tigers football announcers
National Hockey League broadcasters
People from Carbondale, Illinois
People from Florissant, Missouri
People from St. Louis
People from Missouri
Southern Illinois Salukis football players
St. Louis Blues announcers
St. Louis Cardinals (football) announcers
20th-century African-American people
21st-century African-American people